Dethick is part of a parish in Derbyshire, England referred to as Dethick, Lea and Holloway.

Dethick may also refer to:
Dethick Manor, a 16th-century manor house in Dethick, Amber Valley, Derbyshire

People with the surname
Gilbert Dethick (c. 1510–1584), long-serving officer of arms
Humphrey Dethick (fl. 1602), cloth merchant and intriguer.
John Dethick, (died 1671), Lord Mayor of London
Robert Dethick, MP for Derbyshire (UK Parliament constituency)
William Dethick (c. 1542–1612), long-serving officer of arms
William Dethick (died 1408/1410), MP for Derbyshire (UK Parliament constituency)